Kristina Poplavskaja (born 24 July 1972) is a Lithuanian rower who won an Olympic bronze medal in the Double Sculls event at the 2000 Summer Olympics in Sydney.

References

1972 births
Living people
Lithuanian female rowers
Rowers at the 1992 Summer Olympics
Rowers at the 2000 Summer Olympics
Olympic rowers of Lithuania
Olympic bronze medalists for Lithuania
Olympic medalists in rowing

Medalists at the 2000 Summer Olympics